The 50th government of Turkey (25 June 1993 – 5 October 1995) was a coalition government formed by True Path Party (DYP) and Social Democratic Populist Party (SHP).

Background
The prime minister of the 49th government of Turkey was Süleyman Demirel of DYP. When Süleyman Demirel was elected as the president of Turkey, DYP elected Tansu Çiller as its new leader, and Tansu Çiller formed the 50th government of Turkey. She became the first (and so far, the only) female prime minister of Turkey.
On the other hand, the deputy prime minister Erdal İnönü of SHP resigned from the leadership of his party and left his seat to Murat Karayalçın. In 1995, SHP and Republican People's Party (CHP) (which was previously issued from SHP) merged under the existing name of CHP, and Hikmet Çetin was elected as the temporary chairman of the party.
Although the 50th government was basically the same government as the 49th, the change in leaders caused many later changes in the ministers, as is shown in the table below.

The government
In the list below, the serving period of cabinet members who served only a part of the cabinet's lifespan are shown in the column "Notes".

Aftermath
In the first congress of CHP following the fusion on 9 September 1995, Deniz Baykal became the new leader of the party. After talks with Tansu Çiller, he decided to withdraw from the coalition.

References

Democrat Party (Turkey, current) politicians
Social Democratic Populist Party (Turkey) politicians
Republican People's Party (Turkey) politicians
Cabinets of Turkey
1993 establishments in Turkey
1995 disestablishments in Turkey
Cabinets established in 1993
Cabinets disestablished in 1995
Coalition governments of Turkey
Members of the 50th government of Turkey
Democrat Party (Turkey, current)